A. Gareth Brenton FLSW. is a Welsh physicist and chemist known for his work in mass spectrometry.

Early life and education 

Gareth was born in South Wales. He went on to attend the University of Wales at Swansea (now Swansea University) in the early 1970s. He received a Ph.D. in physics in 1979.

Career and research 

Gareth took a position as Professor of Mass Spectrometry in Swansea University in 1982.  He was Director of the Institute of Mass Spectrometry and Director of the EPSRC National Mass Spectrometry Facility at Swansea University until 2016.

Awards and honours 

Gareth won the International Mass Spectrometry Society Curt Brunnée Award in 1994, and the BMSS Medal in 'Recognition of outstanding and sustained contributions to the British Mass Spectrometry Society in the promotion of Mass Spectrometry' in 2016. He was editor of Rapid Communications in Mass Spectrometry. Gareth was BMSS chairman between 2002 and 2004

Key publications

 Beynon, J. H., and A. G. Brenton. An Introduction to Mass Spectrometry / by J.H. Beynon and A.G. Brenton. Cardiff: U of Wales, 1982. Print.

References 

Year of birth missing (living people)
Living people
Welsh physicists
Mass spectrometrists
Alumni of Swansea University
Academics of Swansea University